Although elected in the 1814–1815 United States House of Representatives elections in Massachusetts, Daniel A. White (Federalist) of the  was offered, and accepted, the position of probate judge in Essex County before taking his seat in Congress.

Special election  
A special election was held July 17, 1815, electing Jeremiah Nelson (Federalist) to fill the vacated seat. and he was seated with the rest of the House at the beginning of the 14th United States Congress December 4, 1815.

White's "lost" election 
For unknown reasons, some records credit Nelson with White's votes as if Nelson were elected during the regular cycle without regard for White's election.

References 

 

Massachusetts 1815 03
Massachusetts 1815 03
1815 03
Massachusetts 03
United States House of Representatives 03